The panga is a type of modest-sized, open, outboard-powered, fishing boat common throughout much of the developing world, including Central America, the Caribbean, parts of Africa, the Middle East, and much of Asia.  The original panga design was developed by Yamaha as part of a World Bank project circa 1970. Pangas are commonly operated directly off beaches. The name comes from the panga fish, which is commonly netted. The upswept bow of the boat resembles the machete or knife called a panga.  

Key features of the panga design are a high bow, narrow waterline beam, a delta shaped running surface, and a flotation bulge along the gunwale, or top edge of the hull.  The high bow provides buoyancy for retrieving heavy nets, and minimizes spray coming over the bow.  The narrow beam allows the hull to be propelled by a modest outboard motor. 

The hulls are made of fiberglass or fibre-reinforced plastic, heavily reinforced by numerous bulkheads, and usually have bow and stern enclosed flotation compartments.

Variations
Various boat manufacturers have created designs either based on or inspired by the original panga design, some with more modern amenities than the original panga skiff.

References

Boat types